Idaho is a state in the Pacific Northwest region of the Western United States. To the north, it shares a small portion of the Canada–United States border with the province of British Columbia. It borders the states of Montana and Wyoming to the east, Nevada and Utah to the south, and Washington and Oregon to the west. The state's capital and largest city is Boise.

For thousands of years, and prior to European colonization, Idaho has been inhabited by native peoples. In the early 19th century, Idaho was considered part of the Oregon Country, an area of dispute between the U.S. and the British Empire. It officially became a U.S. territory with the signing of the Oregon Treaty of 1846, but a separate Idaho Territory was not organized until 1863, instead being included for periods in Oregon Territory and Washington Territory. Idaho was eventually admitted to the Union on July 3, 1890, becoming the 43rd state.

Forming part of the Pacific Northwest (and the associated Cascadia bioregion), Idaho is divided into several distinct geographic and climatic regions. The state's north, the relatively isolated Idaho Panhandle, is closely linked with Eastern Washington, with which it shares the Pacific Time Zone—the rest of the state uses the Mountain Time Zone. The state's south includes the Snake River Plain (which has most of the population and agricultural land), and the southeast incorporates part of the Great Basin. Idaho is quite mountainous, and contains several stretches of the Rocky Mountains. The United States Forest Service holds about 38% of Idaho's land, the highest proportion of any state.

Industries significant for the state economy include manufacturing, agriculture, mining, forestry, and tourism. A number of science and technology firms are either headquartered in Idaho or have factories there, and the state also contains the Idaho National Laboratory, which is the country's largest Department of Energy facility. Idaho's agricultural sector supplies many products, but the state is best known for its potato crop, which comprises around one-third of the nationwide yield. The official state nickname is the "Gem State", a figurative expression which references Idaho's natural beauty.

Etymology
The name's origin remains a mystery. In the early 1860s, when the U.S. Congress was considering organizing a new territory in the Rocky Mountains, the name "Idaho" was suggested by George M. Willing, a politician posing as an unrecognized delegate from the unofficial Jefferson Territory. Willing claimed that the name was derived from a Shoshone term meaning "the sun comes from the mountains" or "gem of the mountains", but it was revealed later that there was no such term and Willing claimed that he had been inspired to coin the name when he met a little girl named Ida. Since the name appeared to be fabricated, the U.S. Congress ultimately decided to name the area Colorado Territory instead when it was created in February 1861, but by the time this decision was made, the town of Idaho Springs, Colorado had already been named after Willing's proposal.

The same year Congress created Colorado Territory, a county called Idaho County was created in eastern Washington Territory. The county was named after a steamship named Idaho, which was launched on the Columbia River in 1860. It is unclear whether the steamship was named before or after Willing's claim was revealed. Regardless, part of Washington Territory, including Idaho County, was used to create Idaho Territory in 1863. Idaho Territory would later change its boundaries to the area that became the U.S. state.

History

Humans may have been present in the Idaho area as long as 14,500 years ago. Excavations at Wilson Butte Cave near Twin Falls in 1959 revealed evidence of human activity, including arrowheads, that rank among the oldest dated artifacts in North America. American Indian peoples predominant in the area included the Nez Percé in the north and the Northern and Western Shoshone in the south.

A Late Upper Paleolithic site was identified at Cooper's Ferry in western Idaho near the town of Cottonwood by archaeologists in 2019. Based on evidence found at the site, first people lived in this area 15,300 to 16,600 years ago, predating the Beringia land bridge by about a thousand years. The discoverers emphasized that they possess similarities with tools and artifacts discovered in Japan that date from 16,000 to 13,000 years ago. The discovery also showed that the first people might not have come to North America by land, as previously theorized. On the contrary, they probably came through the water, using a Pacific coastal route.

An early presence of French-Canadian trappers is visible in names and toponyms: Nez Percé, Cœur d'Alène, Boisé, Payette. Some of these names appeared prior to the Lewis and Clark and Astorian expeditions ,which included significant numbers of French and Métis guides recruited for their familiarity with the terrain.

Idaho, as part of the Oregon Country, was claimed by both the United States and Great Britain until the United States gained undisputed jurisdiction in 1846. From 1843 to 1849, present-day Idaho was under the de facto jurisdiction of the Provisional Government of Oregon. When Oregon became a state in 1849, what is now Idaho was situated in what remained of the original Oregon Territory, designated as the Washington Territory.

Between 1849 and the creation of the Idaho Territory in 1863, parts of present-day Idaho were included in the Oregon, Washington, and Dakota Territories. The new Idaho territory included present-day Idaho, Montana, and most of Wyoming. The Lewis and Clark expedition crossed Idaho in 1805 on the way to the Pacific, and in 1806, on the return trip, largely following the Clearwater River in both directions. The first non-indigenous settlement was Kullyspell House, established on the shore of Lake Pend Oreille in 1809 by David Thompson of the North West Company for fur trading. In 1812 Donald Mackenzie, working for the Pacific Fur Company at the time, established a post on the lower Clearwater River near present-day Lewiston. This post, known as "MacKenzie's Post" or "Clearwater", operated until the Pacific Fur Company was bought out by the North West Company in 1813, after which the post was abandoned. The first organized non-indigenous communities within the present borders of Idaho were established in 1860. The first permanent, substantial incorporated community was Lewiston, in 1861.

Idaho achieved statehood in 1890, following a difficult start as a territory, including the chaotic transfer of the territorial capital from Lewiston to Boise, disenfranchisement of Mormon polygamists upheld by the U.S. Supreme Court in 1890, and a federal attempt to split the territory between Washington Territory, which gained statehood in 1889, a year before Idaho, and the state of Nevada which had been a state since 1864, .

Idaho was one of the hardest hit of the Pacific Northwest states during the Great Depression. Prices plummeted for Idaho's major crops: in 1932 a bushel of potatoes brought only ten cents compared to $1.51 in 1919, while Idaho farmers saw their annual income of $686 in 1929 drop to $250 by 1932.

In recent years, Idaho has expanded its commercial base as a tourism and agricultural state to include science and technology industries. Science and technology have become the largest single economic center (over 25% of the state's total revenue) within the state and are greater than agriculture, forestry and mining combined.

During the COVID-19 pandemic, Idaho enacted statewide crisis standards of care as COVID-19 patients overwhelmed hospitals. The state had one of the lowest vaccination rates in the country as of mid-October 2021.

Geography

 
Idaho shares a border with six U.S. states and one Canadian province. The states of Washington and Oregon are to the west, Nevada and Utah are to the south, and Montana and Wyoming are to the east. Idaho also shares a short border with the Canadian province of British Columbia to the north.

The landscape is rugged, with some of the largest unspoiled natural areas in the United States. For example, at 2.3 million acres (930,000 ha), the Frank Church-River of No Return Wilderness Area is the largest contiguous area of protected wilderness in the continental United States. Idaho is a Rocky Mountain state with abundant natural resources and scenic areas. The state has snow-capped mountain ranges, rapids, vast lakes and steep canyons. The waters of the Snake River run through Hells Canyon, the deepest gorge in the United States. Shoshone Falls falls down cliffs from a height greater than Niagara Falls.

By far, the most important river in Idaho is the Snake River, a major tributary of the Columbia River. The Snake River flows from Yellowstone in northwestern Wyoming through the Snake River Plain in southern Idaho before turning north, leaving the state at Lewiston before joining the Columbia in Kennewick. Other major rivers are the Clark Fork/Pend Oreille River, the Spokane River, and, many major tributaries of the Snake River, including the Clearwater River, the Salmon River, the Boise River, and the Payette River. The Salmon River empties into the Snake in Hells Canyon and forms the southern boundary of Nez Perce County on its north shore, of which Lewiston is the county seat. The Port of Lewiston, at the confluence of the Clearwater and the Snake Rivers is the farthest inland seaport on the West Coast at 465 river miles from the Pacific at Astoria, Oregon.

The vast majority of Idaho's population lives in the Snake River Plain, a valley running from across the entirety of southern Idaho from east to west. The valley contains the major cities of Boise, Meridian, Nampa, Caldwell, Twin Falls, Idaho Falls, and Pocatello. The plain served as an easy pass through the Rocky Mountains for westward-bound settlers on the Oregon Trail, and many settlers chose to settle the area rather than risking the treacherous route through the Blue Mountains and the Cascade Range to the west. The western region of the plain is known as the Treasure Valley, bound between the Owyhee Mountains to the southwest and the Boise Mountains to the northeast. The central region of the Snake River Plain is known as the Magic Valley.

Idaho's highest point is Borah Peak, in the Lost River Range north of Mackay. Idaho's lowest point, is in Lewiston, where the Clearwater River joins the Snake River and continues into Washington. The Sawtooth Range is often considered Idaho's most famous mountain range. Other mountain ranges in Idaho include the Bitterroot Range, the White Cloud Mountains, the Lost River Range, the Clearwater Mountains, and the Salmon River Mountains.

Salmon-Challis National Forest is located in the east central sections of the state, with Salmon National Forest to the north and Challis National Forest to the south.

Idaho has two time zones, with the dividing line approximately midway between Canada and Nevada. Southern Idaho, including the Boise metropolitan area, Idaho Falls, Pocatello, and Twin Falls, are in the Mountain Time Zone. A legislative error ( §264) theoretically placed this region in the Central Time Zone, but this was corrected with a 2007 amendment. Areas north of the Salmon River, including Coeur d'Alene, Moscow, Lewiston, and Sandpoint, are in the Pacific Time Zone, which contains less than a quarter of the state's population and land area.

Climate

Idaho's climate varies widely. This influence has a moderating effect in the winter where temperatures are not as low as would otherwise be expected for a northern state with predominantly high elevations. In the panhandle, moist air masses from the coast are released as precipitation over the North Central Rockies forests, creating the North American inland temperate rainforest. The maritime influence is least prominent in the state's eastern part where the precipitation patterns are often reversed, with wetter summers and drier winters, and seasonal temperature differences are more extreme, showing a more semi-arid continental climate.

Hot summer days are tempered by the low relative humidity and cooler evenings during summer months since, for most of the state, the highest diurnal difference in temperature is often in the summer. Winters can be cold, although extended periods of bitter cold weather below zero are unusual.

Lakes and rivers

Protected areas

As of 2018:

National parks, reserves, monuments and historic sites

 Salmon-Challis National Forest
 California National Historic Trail
 City of Rocks National Reserve
 Craters of the Moon National Monument and Preserve
 Hagerman Fossil Beds National Monument
 Lewis and Clark National Historic Trail
 Minidoka National Historic Site
 Nez Perce National Historical Park
 Oregon National Historic Trail
 Yellowstone National Park
 Pacific Northwest National Scenic Trail

National recreation areas

National wildlife refuges and Wilderness Areas

National conservation areas
 Snake River Birds of Prey National Conservation Area

State parks

Demographics

Population

The United States Census Bureau determined Idaho's population was 1,900,923 on July 1, 2021, a 21% increase since the 2010 U.S. census.

Idaho had an estimated population of 1,754,208 in 2018, which was an increase of 37,265, from the prior year and an increase of 186,626, or 11.91%, since 2010. This included a natural increase since the last census of 58,884 (111,131 births minus 52,247 deaths) and an increase due to net migration of 75,795 people into the state. There are large numbers of Americans of English and German ancestry in Idaho. Immigration from outside the United States resulted in a net increase of 14,522 people, and migration within the country produced a net increase of 61,273 people.

This made Idaho the ninth fastest-growing state after Utah (+14.37%), Texas (+14.14%), Florida (+13.29%), Colorado (+13.25%), North Dakota (+13.01%), Nevada (+12.36%), Arizona (+12.20%), and Washington. From 2017 to 2018, Idaho grew the second-fastest, surpassed only by Nevada.

Nampa's population was under 29,000 in 1990 and grew to over 81,000 by 2010. Located between Nampa and Boise, Meridian also experienced high growth, from fewer than 10,000 residents in 1990 to more than 75,000 in 2010 and is now Idaho's third largest city. Growth of 5% or more over the same period has also been observed in Caldwell, Coeur d'Alene, Post Falls, and Twin Falls.

From 1990 to 2010, Idaho's population increased by over 560,000 (55%). The Boise metropolitan area (officially known as the Boise City-Nampa, ID Metropolitan Statistical Area) is Idaho's largest metropolitan area. Other metropolitan areas in order of size are Coeur d'Alene, Idaho Falls, Pocatello and Lewiston.

According to HUD's 2022 Annual Homeless Assessment Report, there were an estimated 1,998 homeless people in Idaho. 

The table below shows the ethnic composition of Idaho's population as of 2016.

According to the 2017 American Community Survey, 12.2% of Idaho's population were of Hispanic or Latino origin (of any race): Mexican (10.6%), Puerto Rican (0.2%), Cuban (0.1%), and other Hispanic or Latino origin (1.3%). The five largest ancestry groups were: German (17.5%), English (16.4%), Irish (9.3%), American (8.1%), and Scottish (3.2%).

Birth data

Note: Births in table don't add up, because Hispanics are counted both by their ethnicity and by their race, giving a higher overall number.

 Since 2016, data for births of White Hispanic origin are not collected, but included in one Hispanic group; persons of Hispanic origin may be of any race.

Religion

According to the Pew Research Center on Religion & Public Life, the self-identified religious affiliations of Idahoans over the age of 18 in 2008 and 2014 were:

According to the Association of Religion Data Archives, the largest denominations by number of members in 2010 were The Church of Jesus Christ of Latter-day Saints with 409,265; the Catholic Church with 123,400; the non-denominational Evangelical Protestant with 62,637; and the Assemblies of God with 22,183.

Language

English is the state's predominant language. Minority languages include Spanish and various Native American languages.

Economy
As of 2016, the state's total employment was 562,282, and the total employer establishments were 45,826.

Gross state product for 2015 was $64.9 billion, and the per capita income based on 2015 GDP and 2015 population estimates was $39,100.

Important industries in Idaho are food processing, lumber and wood products, machinery, chemical products, paper products, electronics manufacturing, silver and other mining, and tourism. The world's largest factory for barrel cheese, the raw product for processed cheese, is in Gooding, Idaho. It has a capacity of 120,000 metric tons per year of barrel cheese and belongs to the Glanbia group.

Hewlett-Packard has operated a large plant in Boise since the 1970s, which is devoted primarily to LaserJet printers production.

Idaho has a state gambling lottery, which contributed $333.5 million in payments to all Idaho public schools and Idaho higher education from 1990 to 2006.

Taxation
Tax is collected by the Idaho State Tax Commission.

The state personal income tax ranges from 1.6% to 7.8% in eight income brackets. Idahoans may apply for state tax credits for taxes paid to other states, as well as for donations to Idaho state educational entities and some nonprofit youth and rehabilitation facilities.

The state sales tax is 6% with a very limited, selective local option up to 6.5%. Sales tax applies to the sale, rental or lease of tangible personal property and some services. Food is taxed, but prescription drugs are not. Hotel, motel, and campground accommodations are taxed at a higher rate (7% to 11%). Some jurisdictions impose local option sales tax.

The sales tax was introduced at 3% in 1965, easily approved by voters, where it remained at 3% until 1983.

Energy

As of 2017, the primary energy source in Idaho was hydropower, and the energy companies had a total retail sales of 23,793,790 megawatt hours (MWh). As of 2017, Idaho had a regulated electricity market, with the Idaho Public Utilities Commission regulating the three major utilities of Avista Utilities, Idaho Power, and Rocky Mountain Power.

Idaho imports most of the energy it consumes. Imports account for more than 80% of energy consumption, including all of Idaho's natural gas and petroleum supplies and more than half of its electricity. Of the electricity consumed in Idaho in 2005, 48% came from hydroelectricity, 42% was generated by burning coal and 9% was generated by burning natural gas. The remainder came from other renewable sources, such as wind.

The state's river basins allow hydroelectric power plants to provide 556,000 MWh, which amounts to about three-fourths of Idaho's electricity generated in the state. Washington State provides most of the natural gas used in Idaho through one of the two major pipeline systems supplying the state. Although the state relies on out-of-state sources for its entire natural gas supply, it uses natural gas-fired plants to generate 127,000 MWh, or about ten percent of its output. Coal-fired generation and the state's small array of wind turbines supplies the remainder of the state's electricity output. The state produces 739,000 MWh but still needs to import half of its electricity from out-of-state to meet demand.

In addition, Idaho also has the 6th fastest growing population in the United States with the population expected to increase by 31% from 2008 to 2030. This projected increase in population will contribute to a 42% increase in demand by 2030, further straining Idaho's finite hydroelectric resources.

Idaho has an upper-boundary estimate of development potential to generate 44,320 GWh/year from 18,076 MW of wind power, and 7,467,000 GWh/year from solar power using 2,061,000 MW of photovoltaics (PV), including 3,224 MW of rooftop photovoltaics, and 1,267,000 MW of concentrated solar power. Idaho had 973 MW of installed wind power as of 2020.

Transportation
The Idaho Transportation Department is the government agency responsible for Idaho's transportation infrastructure, including operations and maintenance, as well as planning for future needs. The agency is also responsible for overseeing the disbursement of federal, state, and grant funding for the transportation programs of the state.

Highways

Major federal aid highways in Idaho:

Airports

Major airports include the Boise Airport which serves the southwest region of Idaho and the Spokane International Airport (in Spokane, Washington) which serves northern Idaho. Other airports with scheduled service are the Pullman-Moscow Regional Airport serving the Palouse; the Lewiston-Nez Perce County Airport, serving the Lewis-Clark Valley and north central and west central Idaho; The Magic Valley Regional Airport in Twin Falls; the Idaho Falls Regional Airport; and the Pocatello Regional Airport.

Railroads

Idaho is served by three transcontinental railroads. The Burlington Northern Santa Fe (BNSF) connects the Idaho Panhandle with Seattle, Portland, and Spokane to the west, and Minneapolis and Chicago to the east. The BNSF travels through Kootenai, Bonner, and Boundary counties. The Union Pacific Railroad crosses North Idaho, entering from Canada through Boundary and Bonner, and proceeding to Spokane. Canadian Pacific Railway uses Union Pacific Railroad tracks in North Idaho, carrying products from Alberta to Spokane and Portland, Oregon. Amtrak's Empire Builder crosses northern Idaho, with its only stop being in Sandpoint. Montana Rail Link also operates between Billings, Montana, and Sandpoint, Idaho.

The Union Pacific Railroad also crosses southern Idaho traveling between Portland, Oregon, Green River, Wyoming, and Ogden, Utah, and serves Boise, Nampa, Twin Falls, and Pocatello.

Ports

The Port of Lewiston is the farthest inland Pacific port on the west coast. A series of dams and locks on the Snake River and Columbia River facilitate barge travel from Lewiston to Portland, where goods are loaded on ocean-going vessels.

Law and government

State constitution

The constitution of Idaho is roughly modeled on the national constitution, with several additions. The constitution defines the form and functions of the state government, and may be amended through plebiscite. The state constitution presently requires the state government to maintain a balanced budget.

Idaho Code and Statutes

All of Idaho's state laws are contained in the Idaho Code and Statutes. The code is amended through the legislature with the approval of the governor. Idaho still operates under its original (1889) state constitution.

State government

The constitution of Idaho provides for three branches of government: the executive, legislative and judicial branches. Idaho has a bicameral legislature, elected from 35 legislative districts, each represented by one senator and two representatives.

Since 1946, statewide elected constitutional officers have been elected to four-year terms. They include: Governor, Lieutenant Governor, Secretary of State, Idaho state controller (Auditor before 1994), Treasurer, Attorney General, and Superintendent of Public Instruction.

Last contested in 1966, Inspector of Mines was an originally elected constitutional office. Afterward it was an appointed position and ultimately done away with entirely in 1974.

Idaho's government has an alcohol monopoly; the Idaho State Liquor Division.

Executive branch

The governor of Idaho serves a four-year term, and is elected during what is nationally referred to as midterm elections. As such, the governor is not elected in the same election year as the president of the United States. The current governor is Republican Brad Little, who was elected in 2018.

Legislative branch

Idaho's legislature is part-time. Because of this, Idaho's legislators are considered "citizen legislators", meaning their position as a legislator is not their main occupation. However, the session may be extended if necessary, and often is.

Terms for both the Senate and House of Representatives are two years. Legislative elections occur every even numbered year.

The Idaho Legislature has been continuously controlled by the Republican Party since the late 1950s, although Democratic legislators are routinely elected from Boise, Pocatello, Blaine County and the northern Panhandle.

Judicial branch

The highest court in Idaho is the Idaho Supreme Court. There is also an intermediate appellate court, the Idaho Court of Appeals, which hears cases assigned to it from the Supreme Court. The state's District Courts serve seven judicial districts.

Politics

After the Civil War, many Midwestern and Southern Democrats moved to the Idaho Territory. As a result, the early territorial legislatures were solidly Democrat-controlled. In contrast, most of the territorial governors were appointed by Republican presidents and were Republicans. This led to sometimes-bitter clashes between the two parties, including a range war with the Democrats backing the sheepherders and the Republicans the cattlemen, which ended in the "Diamondfield" Jack Davis murder trial. In the 1880s, Republicans became more prominent in local politics.

In 1864, Clinton DeWitt Smith removed the territorial seal and the state constitution from a locked safe, and took them to Boise. This effectively moved the capital from where they were stored (Lewiston, Idaho) to the current capital, Boise.

Since statehood, the Republican Party has usually been the dominant party in Idaho. At one time, Idaho had two Democratic parties, one being the mainstream and the other called the Anti-Mormon Democrats, lasting into the early 20th century. In the 1890s and early 1900s, the Populist Party enjoyed prominence, while the Democratic Party maintained a brief dominance in the 1930s during the Great Depression. Since World WarII, most statewide-elected officials have been Republicans, though the Democrats did hold the majority in the House (by one seat) in 1958 and the governorship from 1971 to 1995.

Idaho Congressional delegations have also been generally Republican since statehood. Several Idaho Democrats have had electoral success in the U.S. House of Representatives over the years, but the Senate delegation has been a Republican stronghold for decades. Several Idaho Republicans, including current Senators Mike Crapo and Jim Risch, have won reelection to the Senate, but only Frank Church has won reelection as a Democrat. Church's 1974 victory was the last win for his party for either Senate seat, and Walt Minnick's 2008 victory in the 1st congressional district was the last Democratic win in any congressional race.

In modern times, Idaho has been a reliably Republican state in presidential politics. It has not supported a Democrat for president since 1964. Even in that election, Lyndon Johnson defeated Barry Goldwater in the state by fewer than two percentage points, compared to a landslide nationally. In 2004, Republican George W. Bush carried Idaho by a margin of 38 percentage points and with 68.4% of the vote, winning in 43 of 44 counties. Only Blaine County, which contains the Sun Valley ski resort, supported John Kerry, who owns a home in the area. In 2008 Barack Obama's 36.1 percent showing was the best for a Democratic presidential candidate in Idaho since 1976. However, Republican margins were narrower in 1992 and 1976.

In the 2006 elections, Republicans, led by gubernatorial candidate Butch Otter, won all the state's constitutional offices and retained both of the state's seats in the House. However, Democrats picked up several seats in the Idaho Legislature, notably in the Boise area.

Republicans lost one of the House seats in 2008 to Minnick, but Republican Jim Risch retained Larry Craig's Senate seat for the GOP by a comfortable margin. Minnick lost his seat in the 2010 election to Republican State Rep. Raul Labrador.

Education

K–12

As of January 2020, the State of Idaho contains 105 school districts and 62 charter schools. The school districts range in enrollment from two to 39,507 students.

Idaho school districts are governed by elected school boards, which are elected in November of odd-numbered years, except for the Boise School District, whose elections are held in September.

Colleges and universities

The Idaho State Board of Education oversees three comprehensive universities. The University of Idaho in Moscow was the first university in the state (founded in 1889). It opened its doors in 1892 and is the land-grant institution and primary research university of the state. Idaho State University in Pocatello opened in 1901 as the Academy of Idaho, attained four-year status in 1947 and university status in 1963. Boise State University is the most recent school to attain university status in Idaho. The school opened in 1932 as Boise Junior College and became Boise State University in 1974. Lewis-Clark State College in Lewiston is the only public, non-university four-year college in Idaho. It opened as a normal school in 1893.

Idaho has four regional community colleges: North Idaho College in Coeur d'Alene; College of Southern Idaho in Twin Falls; College of Western Idaho in Nampa, which opened in 2009, College of Eastern Idaho in Idaho Falls, which transitioned from a technical college in 2017.

Private institutions in Idaho are Boise Bible College, affiliated with congregations of the Christian churches and churches of Christ; Brigham Young University-Idaho in Rexburg, which is affiliated with The Church of Jesus Christ of Latter-day Saints and a sister college to Brigham Young University; The College of Idaho in Caldwell, which still maintains a loose affiliation with the Presbyterian Church; Northwest Nazarene University in Nampa; and New Saint Andrews College in Moscow, of reformed Christian theological background. McCall College is a non-affiliated two-year private college in McCall, which was founded in 2011 and later opened in 2013.

Sports

Central Idaho is home to one of North America's oldest ski resorts, Sun Valley, where the world's first chairlift was installed in 1936. Other noted outdoor sites include Hells Canyon, the Salmon River, and its embarkation point of Riggins.

The Boise Open professional golf tournament has been played at Hillcrest Country Club since 1990 as part of the Korn Ferry Tour. The Open has been part of the Korn Ferry Tour Finals since 2016.

High school sports are overseen by the Idaho High School Activities Association (IHSAA).

In 2016, Meridian's Michael Slagowski ran 800 meters in 1:48.70. That is one of the 35 fastest 800-meter times ever run by a high school boy in the United States. Weeks later, he would become only the ninth high school boy to complete a mile in under four minutes, running 3:59.53.

In popular culture
The 1985 film Pale Rider was primarily filmed in the Boulder Mountains and the Sawtooth National Recreation Area in central Idaho, just north of Sun Valley. River Phoenix and Keanu Reeves starred in the 1991 movie My Own Private Idaho, portions of which take place in Idaho. The 2004 cult film Napoleon Dynamite takes place in Preston, Idaho; the film's director, Jared Hess, attended Preston High School.

See also

 Index of Idaho-related articles
 Outline of Idaho
 USS Idaho, 5 ships

Notes

References

External links

 .
 Idaho State Guide, from the Library of Congress
 
 .
 .
 .
 —Annotated list of searchable databases produced by Idaho state agencies.
 .
 .
 .
 .
 .
 .
 .
 

 
1890 establishments in the United States
States and territories established in 1890
States of the United States
Western United States
Contiguous United States